BATS Global Markets is a global stock exchange operator founded in Lenexa, Kansas, with additional offices in London, New York, Chicago, and Singapore. BATS was founded in June 2005, became operator of a licensed U.S. stock exchange in 2008 and opened its pan-European stock market in October 2008. As of February 2016, it operated four U.S. stock exchanges, two U.S. equity options exchanges, the pan-European stock market, and a global market for the trading of foreign exchange products. BATS was acquired by Cboe Global Markets in 2017.

The name 'BATS' was originally an acronym for "Better Alternative Trading System".

History
The company was founded in June 2005 by Dave Cummings, a computer programmer. Cummings said he was inspired to start the company after observing Archipelago Holdings be acquired by the New York Stock Exchange and Instinet be acquired by NASDAQ within a week of each other in 2005. After the launch of BATS, other brokerage firms, hedge funds, and other clients became involved with the company.  Cummings publicized the BATS service by sending emails to companies highlighting the niche that could be carved out by trading on platforms other than the big two—NASDAQ and NYSE.  The niche that he sought for the company was for it to be "a neutral, private, broker-dealer owned, semi-profitable utility" with no party owning more than 20 percent. He noted that the consolidation of the New York Stock Exchange and NASDAQ eliminated competition and they raised prices for their services.  The BATS system was intended to charge less.  Among the items it did to draw customers was to offer free listings to companies with shares that traded a certain amount each day.

Cummings stepped down in 2007 and was replaced by Joe Ratterman who had been associated with the company from the start. Cummings said in his resignation, "As BATS prepares to become an exchange, my ownership of a broker-dealer precludes me from serving in management". Cummings returned to his position as CEO at Tradebot.

European expansion
Under the leadership of Joe Ratterman, in March 2008, BATS entered the European equities markets by establishing a multilateral trading facility (MTF) to compete on a pan-European basis against the incumbent securities exchanges. BATS Europe was formally launched in October 2008.

In February 2011, BATS Global Markets agreed to buy Chi-X Europe, a competitor and largest pan-European MTF at the time, for $300 million. The deal was referred by the Office of Fair Trading to the Competition Commission in June 2011 for further investigation to "determine whether a substantial lessening of competition is probable as a result of the anticipated merger". However, the Competition Commission approved the transaction in late November 2011, leading to BATS closing the deal on 30 November 2011. In April 2011, Bats Global Markets confirmed that Mark Hemsley, CEO of BATS Europe, will be appointed CEO of the combined entity following BATS's acquisition of Chi-X Europe. By April 2012 the technology integration between the two platforms was complete and Chi-X Europe customers were migrated onto the BATS Europe platform.

Initial public offering
Also under the leadership of Joe Ratterman, the company attempted to go public on March 23, 2012, as the first listing on its own exchange, but later withdrew the IPO the same day due to a disastrous glitch in the company's trading systems. The glitch resulted in BATS’s stock price falling from the original $16 offering price to as low as 4¢ a share. Three erroneous Apple trades on the BAS exchange triggered a circuit breaker which temporarily halted trading in that stock. Those trades were later canceled. BATS halted stocks on its exchange that were affected by the glitch and included stocks with ticker symbols beginning with letters A to BFZZZ. It later reopened trading in the affected symbols but decided to withdraw the BATS stock offering.

Following the failed IPO, the BATS board of directors decided to separate the roles of chairman and CEO. Joe Ratterman had previously held both roles. Ratterman received the “unanimous support” of the directors to retain the positions of CEO and president.
In July 2012, BATS named Paul Atkins, a former U.S. Securities and Exchange commissioner, to the role of non-executive chairman of its board of directors.

System issue

In January 2013, BATS admitted that what it called a "system issue" had generated problems with more than 400,000 trades, going back as far as 2008. Specifically, it admitted that prices had been executed that were “equal to or less than the so-called national best bid and offer price”, in violation of Reg NMS.

Merger with Direct Edge
In August 2013, BATS and Direct Edge agreed to merge.

Acquisition by CBOE
In September 2016, it was announced that BATS was to be acquired in early 2017 by CBOE Holdings, which will pay about US$3.2 billion for it.  The transaction closed on March 1, 2017

Operations

United States
In the United States BATS operated two stock exchanges, the BZX Exchange and the BYX Exchange (The BATS Exchanges), which as of 2012 accounted for about 10-12% of all U.S. equity trading on a daily basis. BZX and BYX are different chiefly because of their pricing structure and the BZX is almost four times bigger than the BYX.  At that time, BATS was the third largest stock exchange operator in the United States.

In November 2008, BATS converted its ECN to a national securities exchange, BZX, which allowed BATS to participate in and earn market data fees from the United States consolidated tape plans, reduce its clearing costs, and operate a primary listings business. In February 2010, BATS expanded into a new asset class by offering trading of listed equity options on BZX. In October 2010, BATS launched BYX, a second national securities exchange for trading listed cash equity securities. BATS launched a primary listings business in the United States on its BZX Exchange in December 2010 and launched its first listings of seven ETFs in January 2012.

With BYX, BATS offered a different pricing model than its larger market, BZX.

Europe
BATS entered the European equities markets in 2008, with the launch of BATS Europe, a pan-European multilateral trading facility (MTF).  In 2011 it acquired Chi-X Europe, a competitor and largest pan-European MTF at the time, this was merged with BATS Europe.

Notable officers
Eric Swanson was Senior Vice President, General Counsel, and Secretary. He joined as General Counsel in January 2008.

In 2014, company president William O'Brien disputed assertions in the book Flash Boys: A Wall Street Revolt. He was quoted in The New York Times as saying about the book's author, "Michael Lewis clearly has a blind side, as we’ve just discovered". O'Brien was "referring to a previous work by the journalist", the paper reported. O'Brien and Lewis engaged in a "heated debate" on a live CNBC broadcast relating to high-frequency trading, in the first days of the book's release and after an appearance by Lewis on 60 Minutes. 

Six months after the company's merger with Direct Edge, O'Brien stepped down as president of the company, and was replaced by CEO Joe Ratterman, who resumed the position of dual CEO/president (a position he previously held from June 2007 through January 2014).

See also
Direct Edge 
 List of stock exchanges
 List of stock exchanges in the Americas 
List of stock exchange mergers in the Americas

References

External links 

Financial services companies established in 2005
Stock exchanges in the United States
Companies based in Kansas
Options exchanges in the United States
2017 mergers and acquisitions